Mount Pomiu is a mountain in Sichuan province, South East China.

The mountain is 5413 m (17,759 ft) high, and is also known as Celestial Peak, and is found in The Four Girls (Signuniang) Nature Reserve.
The highest mountain in The Four Girls Nature Reserve is 'The Four Girls Mountain' (Mount Siguniang), which is 6,240–6,250 m tall.

Notable ascents
1984 – First ascent by Allen Steck, and a companion.
1985 – Second ascent by Keith Brown, new route
2005 – South west ridge first ascent by Mr. Qiu Xiang and Liu Xinan

References

Pomiu